The Incredible Hulk Returns is a 1988 American television superhero film based on the Marvel Comics character the Hulk which serves as a continuation of the 1978–1982 television series The Incredible Hulk.

In The Incredible Hulk Returns, Dr. David Banner, a scientist who transforms into a green-skinned superhuman monster when enraged, believes that he has found a potential cure for his condition, but he is delayed by the inexplicable arrival of the arrogant Viking warrior Thor. Bill Bixby returns as Banner and Lou Ferrigno reprises his role of the Hulk. Eric Kramer makes his first and only appearance as Thor and Steve Levitt stars as Donald Blake. This was also Jack Colvin's last appearance as Jack McGee.

Plot

Dr. David Banner has been gainfully employed at the Joshua-Lambert Research Institute (as David Bannion) where he and a team of scientists are putting the final touches on a Gamma Transponder, which he intends to use to cure him of his ability to turn into the Hulk. He has not changed into the Hulk for two years since he met a young widow, Maggie Shaw, with whom he is romantically involved. By chance, he is recognized by a former student of his, Donald Blake. Blake reveals that, on an expedition in Norway, he was bound into possession of a magical hammer containing the soul of Thor, an immortal Viking warrior banished from Valhalla and reluctantly compelled to serve Blake, who can summon Thor by speaking Odin's name. Thor is summoned and clumsily angers Banner until he turns into the Hulk, who brawls with Thor and leaves.

In the morning, Banner scolds Blake for setting back his experiment and demands that he and Thor make amends. Journalist Jack McGee hears of sightings of the Hulk and attempts to track him down. Thor bonds with Blake at a bar, briefly entertaining the possibility of Thor using his powers to fight crime. A Cajun gang outside the Joshua-Lambert Institute seek to kidnap Banner and the Transponder, but the Hulk effortlessly dispatches them. The mob leader Jack LeBeau targets Dr. Shaw instead of Banner. Mob members disguised as police officers ambush Banner and Shaw and kidnap Shaw despite the combined efforts of the Hulk and Thor.

LeBeau blackmails Banner into handing over the Transponder in return for Shaw's life. Banner sabotages the Transponder so it cannot be used as a weapon, removing his chance of a cure. Hulk, Blake, and Thor ambush the gang's hideout and fight off a legion of gunmen to rescue Shaw. McGee is once again the subject of ridicule for his obsession with the Hulk and Thor. Blake and Banner both agree that Shaw has likely figured out that Banner and the Hulk are one and the same. Thor and Blake, now at peace with each other, say their goodbyes to Banner. Banner is forced to end his relationship with Shaw and once again leaves to find a cure.

Cast
Bill Bixby as David Banner
Lou Ferrigno as Hulk
Jack Colvin as Jack McGee
Steve Levitt as Donald Blake
Eric Kramer as Thor
Tim Thomerson as Jack LeBeau
Charles Napier as Mike Fouche
Lee Purcell as Dr. Margaret Shaw
John Gabriel as Joshua Lambert
Jay Baker as Zachary Lambert

Production
Unlike the preceding series which was produced by MCA/Universal, this film and the following two sequels were produced by New World Television (New World was Marvel's owner at the time) and Bill Bixby's production outfit, which, in association with NBC, took over the Hulk television franchise from former broadcaster CBS.

Bill Bixby recruited Nicholas Corea, who wrote and/or directed many episodes of the Incredible Hulk TV series, to write and direct The Incredible Hulk Returns. Stan Lee was a consultant on the film. Kenneth Johnson, the creator/executive producer (and sometimes writer/director) of the TV series, was not invited to contribute to the film.

This television movie acted as a backdoor pilot for an unproduced television series featuring Thor, another Marvel Comics character created by Stan Lee and Jack Kirby based on the Norse mythological deity of the same name. Much like the television treatment of the Hulk, Thor's backstory has been altered from his original comic book appearance: while in the comics Donald Blake and Thor shared the same body and could transform by use of an enchanted cane, Thor is here depicted as being a servant of Blake and they are two separate entities. In The Incredible Hulk Returns, Thor is neither Asgardian nor a god (though he does once claim to be the "son of Odin"), and is instead described as a long-dead Viking king who was denied access to Valhalla for the sin of arrogance, for which he must perform a number of heroic acts, similar to the trials of Heracles. Additionally Thor's powers are heavily limited; while he has superhuman strength, he cannot fly or control the weather and his hammer is not restricted by the "worthiness enchantment" from the comics. The hammer itself, not named Mjölnir, is used to summon Thor into the mortal world, by which Blake must say Odin's name.

The movie was filmed between November 1987 and January 1988 in Los Angeles.

This film is the first time another character from the Marvel Universe or any genuinely supernatural or otherworldly elements appeared in the universe of the Incredible Hulk TV series. Thor and the Hulk next appeared on-screen together in 2012's The Avengers, played by Chris Hemsworth and Mark Ruffalo respectively.

Reception
The Incredible Hulk Returns was a major ratings success, outdoing even the high expectations directed to it as a reunion of the Incredible Hulk TV series.

Home media
This television film was released by Anchor Bay Entertainment on May 13, 2008 along with The Trial of the Incredible Hulk as a DVD double feature to coincide with the release of The Incredible Hulk. They were re-released by Image Entertainment on October 11, 2011.

References

External links

Hulk Smash Television!

1988 action films
1988 television films
1988 films
Hulk (comics) films
NBC network original films
Television series reunion films
Films based on television series
Television films as pilots
Television pilots not picked up as a series
The Incredible Hulk (1978 TV series)
Thor (Marvel Comics) films
1980s superhero films
Live-action films based on Marvel Comics
Television shows based on mythology
1980s American films